Five Fingers is a 2005 Malayalam romance film by Sanjeev Raj starring Kunchacko Boban and Karthika.

Plot
Five close friends, Manu (Kunchako Boban), Meera (Karthika), Rafeeq (Sudheesh), Ashok Baby and Vijayakumar, are studying at a college. They are very close pals and are ready to do anything for each other.

Cast
Kunchacko Boban ...  Manu
Karthika ...  Meera
Sudheesh ...  Rafeeq
Riyaz Khan ...  Hari Narayanan IPS
Siddique ...  Chandrappan
Bineesh Kodiyeri ...  Amit
Sai Kumar ...  Krishna Murthy
Augustine ...  Kuriachan
Janardhanan ...  Fr. Nedumbaran
Kalpana...  Marykutti
K. P. A. C. Sunny
Madhupal ...  Sunnychan
K. G. George ...  Doctor
Ambika Mohan...Rafeeq's Mother

Track listing
The film has songs. The songs are composed by Benny Johnson. The lyrics were penned by Sachidhanandan Puzhankara.

External links
 
 https://web.archive.org/web/20120407114902/http://popcorn.oneindia.in/title/2342/five-fingers.html

2000s Malayalam-language films
2000s romantic action films
Indian romantic action films
Indian teen romance films
2005 films
2000s teen films